C39 is an untarred road in central Namibia. It is 460 kilometres long and connects Torra Bay to Otavi. At Otavi the road connects with the B1 to Tsumeb and Windhoek and the B8 to Rundu.

Roads in Namibia
Kunene Region